The 12175 / 12176 Chambal Express is a Express train of the Indian Railways connecting  in West Bengal and  of Madhya Pradesh. It is currently being operated with 12175/12176 train numbers three days a week.

Service

The 12175/Chambal Express has an average speed of 55 km/hr and covers 1288 km in 23 hrs 30 mins. 12176/Chambal Express has an average speed of 55 km/hr and covers 1288 km in 23 hrs 30 mins.

Route & halts

The important halts of the train are:

Coach composition 
The train has got LHB rakes from 12 January 2019 with max speed of 120 kmph. The train consists of 20 coaches:

 2 AC II Tier
 4 AC III Tier
 10 sleeper coaches
 4 general
 1 second-class luggage/parcel van
 1 PC

Traction

Both trains are hauled by a Howrah-based WAP-7 (HOG)-equipped locomotive on its entire journey.

Rake sharing

The train shares its rake with 12177/12178 Howrah–Mathura Chambal Express.

See also 
 Howrah Junction railway station
 Gwalior Junction railway station
 Howrah–Mathura Chambal Express

Notes

External links 

 12175 Chambal Express India Rail Info
 12176 Chambal Express India Rail Info

References 

Rail transport in Howrah
Transport in Gwalior
Rail transport in West Bengal
Rail transport in Madhya Pradesh
Rail transport in Jharkhand
Rail transport in Bihar
Rail transport in Uttar Pradesh
Railway services introduced in 1988
Express trains in India
Named passenger trains of India